Muribacter is a genus of bacteria from the class of Pasteurellaceae with one known species (Muribacter muris). Muribacter muris has been isolated from a mouse.

References

Pasteurellales
Bacteria genera
Monotypic bacteria genera